Isomescaline (2,3,4-trimethoxyphenethylamine) is a lesser-known compound based on a well-known psychedelic drug.  It is an isomer of mescaline, as well as an analog of TIM-2, TIM-3, and TIM-4. Isomescaline was first synthesized by Alexander Shulgin. In his book PIHKAL, it is suggested that any potentially active dose would be "greater than 400 mg". Despite its structural similarity to mescaline, isomescaline has produced no effects in humans. Very little data exists about the pharmacological properties, metabolism, and toxicity of isomescaline.

See also 
 Phenethylamine
 Psychedelics, dissociatives and deliriants

References

Psychedelic phenethylamines
Phenol ethers